Robert Rudolph may refer to:

 Robert Knight Rudolph (1906–1986), American Reformed Episcopal minister and theologian
 Robert Livingston Rudolph (1865–1930), American bishop of the Reformed Episcopal Church